John Leopold Donat of Trautson (2 May 1659 in Vienna – 18 October 1724 in Sankt Pölten) was an Austrian nobleman and politician. Since 1711 he was the first Prince of Trautson, Imperial Count von Falkenstein and Baron zu Sprecherstein. He was educator, chamberlain and Obersthofmeister of Emperor Joseph I.

Biography 
John was the son of Johann Franz Trautson, Count of Falkenstein (1609–1663) and Maria Margareta von Rappach (1621–1705). 

John Leopold became the tutor of the young future Emperor Joseph I. When Joseph ascended the throne in 1705, he made his confidant Johann Leopold Obersthofmeister and appointed him, together with Prince Eugene, to the Secret Conference, the most important government body. 
In 1698, he became a Knight in the Order of the Golden Fleece. In 1711, a few weeks before his untimely death, the Emperor elevated him to the rank of imperial prince. By 1712 he had the Palais Trautson built in Vienna, as a sign of his new dignity. 
in 1721, Emperor Charles VI appointed him a second time Oberhofmeister, after the death of Anton Florian, Prince of Liechtenstein, who had succeeded him in 1711.

Marriage and children 
He married in July 1694 with Maria Theresia Ungnad von Weißenwolff (1678–1741) and had:

Johann Wilhelm (1700–1775), his successor;
Maria Christina (1702–1743), married Count Ottokar von Starhemberg (1681–1733);
Johann Josef (1707–1757), Prince-Archbishop of Vienna;
Maria Franziska Antonia (1708–1761), married Prince Heinrich Joseph Johann of Auersperg.

References

External links
BLKÖ

1659 births
1724 deaths
17th-century Austrian people
Austrian Empire politicians
Knights of the Golden Fleece
Obersthofmeister